The Chihuahua Hill Historic District, in Silver City, New Mexico, is a  historic district which was listed on the National Register of Historic Places in 1984.
 
It is bounded by Cooper, Spring, Bullard, and Chihuahua Streets, and dates back to 1870.  It includes 73 contributing buildings.

It was the "original 'Mexican village' of Silver City of the 1880s" and it was still primarily populated by Spanish-surname families in 1982.

References

External links

Historic districts on the National Register of Historic Places in New Mexico
National Register of Historic Places in Grant County, New Mexico
Buildings and structures completed in 1870